Zachary James "Zach" Wallace (born 29 September 1999) is an English field hockey player who plays as a midfielder or forward for Dutch Hoofdklasse club HGC and the England and Great Britain national teams.

He was educated from years 7-11 at Kingston Grammar School, Kingston-upon-Thames before joining Whitgift School, South Croydon, London in the 6th form.

Club career
In March 2021 it was announced that Wallace will join Dutch Hoofdklasse club HGC for the 2021–22 season.

He previously played in the Men's England Hockey League Premier Division for Surbiton.

International career
Wallace made his senior international debuts in October 2018, aged 19, for Great Britain versus Belgium on 2 October 2018 and for England versus France on 16 October 2018. In December 2019, he was nominated for the FIH Rising Star of the Year Award.

On 28 May 2021, he was selected in the England squad for the 2021 EuroHockey Championship.

References

External links
 

1999 births
Living people
English male field hockey players
Male field hockey midfielders
Male field hockey forwards
2018 Men's Hockey World Cup players
Surbiton Hockey Club players
Men's England Hockey League players
People educated at Kingston Grammar School
Field hockey players at the 2020 Summer Olympics
Olympic field hockey players of Great Britain
HGC players
Men's Hoofdklasse Hockey players
2023 Men's FIH Hockey World Cup players
Commonwealth Games bronze medallists for England
Commonwealth Games medallists in field hockey
Field hockey players at the 2022 Commonwealth Games
Medallists at the 2022 Commonwealth Games